The Armenia national football team has represented Armenia in international association football since 1992 after the country declared independence following the dissolution of the Soviet Union in 1991. Prior to this, Armenian players had represented the Soviet Union national football team. The team is governed by the Football Federation of Armenia (FFA) and competes as a member of the Union of European Football Associations (UEFA), which encompasses the countries of Europe and Israel. Having gained independence, the FFA was founded in 1992 and became a member of UEFA and Fédération Internationale de Football Association (FIFA) in the same year. The team played its first international match on 14 October 1992, drawing 0–0 with Moldova in a friendly, although the match is not recognised by FIFA as Moldova were not affiliated with the organisation at the time. Their first officially recognised fixture was played two years later, in May 1994, against the United States.

As of November 2018, Armenia have played 201 international fixtures, winning 49, drawing 42 and losing 110. The team's most frequent opponents have been Andorra, Denmark, Macedonia and Ukraine, having met each nation eight times. Of these teams, Armenia have been most successful against Andorra, winning seven of their eight fixtures, and least successful against Ukraine, failing to win any of the eight fixtures. In global and continental competitions, Armenia have competed in qualification groups for both the FIFA World Cup, since 1998, and the UEFA European Championship, since 1996, but have failed to qualify for any tournament finals.

Sargis Hovsepyan is Armenia's most capped player of all time and is the only player to have accumulated 100 appearances for the national team. The defender made his international debut in his country's first ever fixture in 1992, he earned his 100th cap in a 2–0 defeat to Belgium in October 2008 and finished his career with 131 caps. His last cap for Armenia was on 14 November 2012 in a 4–2 defeat to Lithuania, where he was invited to make a ceremonial appearance and played the opening five minutes of the match before being substituted. As of November 2018, Henrikh Mkhitaryan is Armenia's leading goalscorer of all time, having scored 26 goals. He scored his first international goal in 2009 and became his nation's highest scoring player on 15 October 2013 after scoring against Italy to surpass Artur Petrosyan's tally of eleven goals. Mkhitaryan's total includes a hat-trick during a 7–1 victory over Guatemala in May 2016, the first hat-trick in Armenia's history and one of only two scored by the team.

Hovsepyan was also the first player to earn 25 caps for Armenia, reaching the tally on 7 May 1997 in a 1–1 draw with Ukraine, one match before Petrosyan. The pair competed for the record of most capped player for several years before Petrosyan retired after his 68th cap while both players were tied for the record. Hovsepyan subsequently took the record in his following appearance, a 1–1 draw with Romania in November 2004, and went on to win his 100th cap on 10 September 2008. Roman Berezovsky is the second-highest capped player and the closest to Hovsepyan's record tally, winning 94 caps during his playing career as a goalkeeper. As of November 2018, 44 players have played in 25 or more international fixtures for Armenia.

Players 

Appearances and goals are composed of FIFA World Cup and UEFA European Championships, and each competition's required qualification matches, as well as numerous international friendly tournaments and matches. Players are listed by number of caps. If the number of caps is equal, the players are then listed alphabetically. Statistics updated following match played on 19 November 2018.

Note: Armenia's first international fixture against Moldova on 14 October 1992 is not recognised by FIFA as Moldova were not members of either FIFA or UEFA at the time. As such, the match is excluded from the totals in the table below and the notes column lists which players appeared in the match.

Notes

References

   
Association football player non-biographical articles